The Brighton Collaboration (BC) is a non-profit global vaccine safety research network for health care professionals, named after the city in England where the idea was first formulated.

The Brighton Collaboration was launched in 2000, although the idea of the collaboration started one year earlier, following a presentation by Bob Chen at an international scientific vaccine conference in Brighton. In his talk, he stressed the need to improve vaccine safety monitoring by developing internationally accepted standards.

References 

Vaccination-related organizations